Gillespie Corners is a road junction and unincorporated locale in Lane County, Oregon, United States. Gillespie Corners lies at the intersection of Territorial Highway and Lorane Highway, southwest of Eugene.

The locale was named for brothers Marcellus and Walter Gillespie, grandsons of pioneer Jacob Gillespie, who was a member of the Oregon Territorial Legislature and the namesake for Gillespie Butte in Eugene.

References

External links
Restore Oregon application for 2012 Oregon's Most Endangered Places for Lorane Elementary School, includes history of Gillespie Corners

Unincorporated communities in Lane County, Oregon
Unincorporated communities in Oregon